The Seattle Sun may refer to the following newspapers in Seattle, Washington, United States:

 Seattle Sun (alternative weekly), 1974–1982, a weekly newspaper
 Seattle Sun (2002-2005), a monthly neighborhood newspaper

See also
 Seattle Sun and Star (2005), bi-weekly neighborhood newspaper